Neil Isaac Adonis (born 1 March 1969, in Cape Town) is a South African baseball player. Adonis competed for South Africa at the 2000 Summer Olympics, where he appeared in 3 games as the designated hitter (DH), going 0-8 in his plate appearances. Adonis managed the South African team during the qualifiers for the 2020 Summer Olympics.

References

1969 births
Living people
Sportspeople from Cape Town
South African baseball players
Olympic baseball players of South Africa
Baseball designated hitters
Baseball players at the 2000 Summer Olympics